Albert Óskarsson (born 13 June 1968) is an Icelandic former basketball player. He won the Icelandic championship four times and the Icelandic Basketball Cup three times as a member of Keflavík.

Club career
Albert started his career with Keflavík during the second half of the 1987–1988 season. Following the 1996–1997 season, he played sparingly to focus on his educations. He retired from top-level play in January 2001.

National team career
Albert debuted for the Iceland national team in 1990 and played 38 games for the team until 1997.

References

External links
Úrvalsdeild statistics at Icelandic Basketball Association

1968 births
Living people
Forwards (basketball)
Albert Oskarsson
Albert Oskarsson